Yao Xuchen (born 11 September 1999) is a Chinese footballer who plays as a left-footed winger for Hebei.

Club career
As a member of the Hebei China Fortune youth academy, Yao Xuchen moved to the Serbian side Radnički Pirot on 6 October 2017, along with teammates Wei Changsheng, Wang Hongzhi, Li Shuaihu, Yang Shaochen and Yang Chenyu as a part of a cooperation between the two teams. He would be promoted to the senior team on  1 March 2018, until his loan period officially ended on 30 June 2018. Under head coach Goran Lazarević, Yao would be selected for the 27 April 2018, 24th league fixture match of the 2017–18 Serbian First League campaign against Jagodina as an unused substitute. He made his professional debut replacing Nemanja Petrov in 83rd minute of the away match against Novi Pazar on 6 May 2018. After the match against Radnički Kragujevac, when he was also used as a back-up, Yao started his first match on the pitch in 0–0 draw to Inđija on 26 May 2018. Finally, he also started the last game of the season, making an assist to Nemanja Petrov in 3–0 away victory over Sloboda Užice.

In February 2019, Yao was loaned to China League One side Beijing Sport University for the 2019 season. This would be followed by another loan period with Inner Mongolia Zhongyou. On his return he would be promoted to the senior team of Hebei and would make his debut for the club in a league game on 23 April 2021 against Wuhan in a 1-1 draw. He would go on to score his first goal on 19 July 2021 against Changchun Yatai in a league game that ended in a 2-1 victory.

International career
At the beginning of May 2018, it was announced Yao had been called into the China under-19 national team, along with teammates Yang Chenyu and Wei Changsheng, who had already played with the team. He missed to take a part in the squad because of the club's schedule.

Career statistics

.

References

External links

1999 births
Living people
Sportspeople from Baoding
Footballers from Hebei
Association football forwards
Chinese footballers
Hebei F.C. players
FK Radnički Pirot players
Beijing Sport University F.C. players
Inner Mongolia Zhongyou F.C. players
Serbian First League players
China League One players
Chinese expatriate footballers
Chinese expatriate sportspeople in Serbia
Expatriate footballers in Serbia
21st-century Chinese people